The border between the modern states of Switzerland and Italy extends for , from the French-Swiss-Italian tripoint at Mont Dolent in the west to the Austrian-Swiss-Italian tripoint near Piz Lad in the east. 
Much of the border runs across the High Alps, rising above  as it passes east of Dufourspitze, but it also descends to the lowest point in Switzerland as it passes Lago Maggiore at below .

It is the longest border of both Italy and of Switzerland.

History
The border is a product of the Napoleonic period, established with the provisional constitution of the Helvetic Republic of 15 January 1798, restored in 1815.
While this border existed as a border of Switzerland from 1815, there was only a unified Italian state to allow the existence of a "Swiss-Italian border" with the formation of the Kingdom of Italy in 1861, it previously comprised the borders between Switzerland and the Kingdom of Sardinia, the Kingdom of Lombardy–Venetia and the province of Cisleithania of Austria-Hungary. 
There remained some territorial disputes after the formation of the Kingdom of Italy, resolved in the Convenzione tra l'Italia e la Svizzera per l'accertamento della frontiera fra la Lombardia ed il Cantone dei Grigioni of 1863. Other Swiss-Italian treaties regarding the course of the border date to 1873/4, 1936/7 and 1941. 

Since 1946, it has remained unchanged as the border between the Italian Republic and the Swiss Confederacy, with the exception of minor corrections and exchanges of territory, such as the inclusion of the Lago di Lei barrage in Switzerland in the 1950s. In 2008 Switzerland became part of the Schengen Area, meaning that border controls were removed along this border as of 12 December 2008. However, while border guards from both countries are no longer allowed to stop travellers for the sole purpose of passport checks, they can still carry out customs checks, as Switzerland is not in the EU Customs Union.

Detailed path
The border as shown by Swisstopo separates the Swiss canton of Valais from the Italian Aosta Valley and Piedmont region, the canton of Ticino from Piedmont and Lombardy, and the canton of Grisons from Lombardy and South Tyrol.

The border now encircles the Italian Domodossola valley, passing Gonda, Monte Leone, Bortelhorn, Helsenhorn, traversed by the Simplon Tunnel connecting Brig with Varzo, Grieshorn just south of Nufenen Pass, and forming the western border of Ticino runs across  Marchhorn, Basodino, Pizzo Fiorera, Wandfluhhorn, Pizzo Quadro, Pizzo di Porcaresc, Pilone and descends below  running across  Centovalli along a stretch of the Melezza.

It rises again to Pilone peak before descending to Lago Maggiore between Brissago and Cannobio, on the left bank making landfall at Caviano and passing west of Lugano and the villages of Malcantone to Ponte Tresa at Lake Lugano.

It then forms the southernmost corner of Switzerland including Chiasso, turning north again outside of Como and now forming the eastern border of Ticino  running west of Lake Como, of passing Lake Lugano again west of Lugano and touching  Monte Boglia, Cima di Fojorina, Gazzirola,  Cima di Cugn,  Pizzo Campanile,  again reaching   at Pizzo Quadro between Val Mesolcina and Chiavenna, and further north to Pizzo Tambo, Splügen Pass and Piz Timun.

The Swiss-Italia border here has the peculiarity of including the reservoir of Lago di Lei in Italy but in an artificial salient including the reservoir's dam in Switzerland. 
Turning south again it traverses Val Bregaglia at Castasegna and turns east towards Cima di Castello, now forming the northern border of the Valtellina, a territory that was lost by the Three Leagues in 1797 with the formation of the Cisalpine Republic.

Val Poschiavo remains part of Grisons, and is separated from Valtellina by the border passing just north of Tirano, turning north again along Piz Paradisin, Munt Cotschen, Piz da l'Acqua to the inclusion of Livigno in Italy.

The border now follows the southern watershed of Val Müstair, touching Piz Murtaröl, Piz Tea Fondada, Piz Schumbraida, Piz Umbrail until it reaches the pass road connecting   Vinschgau with the Valtellina and Stilfserjoch. The border now turns north for a final stretch separating Val Müstair and the Engadin from Vinschgau, South Tyrol, terminating at the Austrian-Swiss-Italian tripoint just north of Piz Lad.

Campione d'Italia
Campione d'Italia is a comune of the Province of Como in the Lombardy region of Italy and an exclave surrounded by the Swiss canton of Ticino.

The entire territory of the Italian village was de facto included in the Swiss Customs Area as per a unilateral decision by the Swiss authorities. Being an exclave of Italy, it is not possible to reach the territory without crossing either Swiss territory or waters. On 1 January 2020, Campione and the Italian waters of Lake Lugano became part of the European Customs Union and a customs border crossing and check points were established.

Illegal immigration
In 2016, due to increased illegal immigration from Italy into Switzerland related to the European migrant crisis, the Swiss government cracked down on the practice, establishing more stringent controls in Swiss-bound trains and deploying helicopter and drone patrols. The government rejected calls to build a fence along the border. In April 2017, the Italian foreign ministry called the Swiss ambassador for "urgent talks" after Switzerland decided to close "three minor border crossings" at night.

References
  

 
European Union external borders
Borders of Switzerland
Borders of Italy